Ross Oscar Charles Bohlin is a former Australian politician. He was a Country Liberal Party member of the Northern Territory Legislative Assembly, and held his seat of Drysdale from his defeat of sitting Labor member Chris Natt at the 2008 election until 2012.

|}

Bohlin was born in Adelaide, South Australia, and served in the Australian Army. He moved to the Northern Territory in the 1990s, and joined the Northern Territory Police in 1998.

Ross was not re-endorsed by his own party to stand in the 2012 Northern Territory general election. This has been gossip within the CLP since May 2011, after he angered several of his colleagues by publicly supporting the distribution of condoms at a Darwin music festival. Nonetheless, he was surprised when he lost his preselection.  CLP Party President Sue Fraser-Adams, was quoted in a newspaper article that "politics doesn't suit him, it's a lot harder than it looks"  she went on to say that it was a safe seat for the party. Bohlin announced that he would run as an independent candidate in July.

References

Living people
Members of the Northern Territory Legislative Assembly
Country Liberal Party members of the Northern Territory Legislative Assembly
Australian police officers
Politicians from Adelaide
Year of birth missing (living people)
Independent members of the Northern Territory Legislative Assembly
21st-century Australian politicians